Colyton is a community in the Manawatu District and Manawatū-Whanganui region in New Zealand's central North Island.

Colyton has the postcode of 4775.

Demographics
The SA1 area is part of the larger Taonui statistical area.

The SA1 area had a population of 159 at the 2018 New Zealand census, an increase of 9 people (6.0%) since the 2013 census, and an increase of 48 people (43.2%) since the 2006 census. There were 57 households, comprising 81 males and 78 females, giving a sex ratio of 1.04 males per female. The median age was 43.3 years (compared with 37.4 years nationally), with 30 people (18.9%) aged under 15 years, 21 (13.2%) aged 15 to 29, 81 (50.9%) aged 30 to 64, and 27 (17.0%) aged 65 or older.

Ethnicities were 92.5% European/Pākehā, 7.5% Māori, and 3.8% Asian. People may identify with more than one ethnicity.

Although some people chose not to answer the census's question about religious affiliation, 62.3% had no religion, and 32.1% were Christian.

Of those at least 15 years old, 21 (16.3%) people had a bachelor's or higher degree, and 21 (16.3%) people had no formal qualifications. The median income was $39,500, compared with $31,800 nationally. 30 people (23.3%) earned over $70,000 compared to 17.2% nationally. The employment status of those at least 15 was that 75 (58.1%) people were employed full-time, and 27 (20.9%) were part-time.

Education

History

Colyton Clocks: The largest collection of timepieces in the Southern Hemisphere from all over the world. The oldest piece is over 300 years old and many others are over 100 years old. 

Colyton is named after Colyton, Devon, from where many of the early settlers of the district had come. 

Colyton Hall: The Hall was built in 1890, and following a fire in 1995 was rebuilt. Because of the rebuild, the hall has many modern amenities. The Hall has a news board outside to show local events.

References

Populated places in Manawatū-Whanganui
Manawatu District